A. C. Meda 1913 is an Italian association football company based in Meda (MB), Lombardy Italy. It currently plays in Seconda Categoria Under 21 Lombardy group G

History
The club was founded in 1913 as Associazione Calcio Meda 1913 and refounded several times, the last, with the current name, on June 17, 2010 deciding to address only the youth sector, but there is a first team football.

A.S.D. Meda 1913
The most important team of the company is the A.S.D. Meda 1913  that, in the season 2010–11, was promoted from Terza Categoria Under 21 group A to Seconda Categoria Under 21.

Colors and badge
The team's colors are black and white, as those its municipality.

Stadium
The team plays its home matches at the Città di Meda in Meda, which has a capacity of 3,000.

References

External links
 Official Website 

 
Football clubs in Italy
Football clubs in Lombardy
Association football clubs established in 1913
Serie C clubs
1913 establishments in Italy